The Adapta WRT is a World Rally Championship team. Sometimes it is referred to as Adapta AS. It has previously competed with Subaru Impreza WRC of many evolutions, now they use Ford Fiesta RS WRC. Adapta WRT is signed to manufacturers championship with Mads Østberg and Eyvind Brynildsen for 2012 season.

WRC Results

References 

World Rally Championship teams
European Rally Championship teams